James Daniel Maddison (born 23 November 1996) is an English professional footballer who plays as an attacking midfielder for  club Leicester City and the England national team.

Maddison began his career with Coventry City before joining Norwich City in 2016. He spent the 2016–17 season on loan at Scottish Premiership club Aberdeen. In his first season back at Norwich, Maddison was named in the Championship PFA Team of the Year and EFL Team of the Season. He joined Premier League club Leicester City in 2018.

Maddison was capped by England at under-21 level from 2017 to 2019, and made his debut for the senior team in 2019. He was part of the 2022 FIFA World Cup squad.

Early life
Maddison was born and raised in Coventry, West Midlands. He has Irish ancestry through a grandparent.

Club career

Coventry City
Maddison joined Coventry City's youth team, and was included in the first-team squad in the 2013–14 season, though did not make an appearance. He made his debut in August 2014, coming on as a substitute in a 2–1 League Cup defeat to Cardiff City. Maddison made his league debut, again as a substitute, in a 3–1 home loss against Bristol City and his first league start in the following game, against Oldham Athletic. He scored his first league goal in the game, with a free kick in the first half, as the Sky Blues lost the game 4–1.

In November 2014, Maddison signed his first professional contract, lasting three-and-a-half years, but missed much of the rest of the 2014–15 season after being sent off during a Boxing Day defeat to Doncaster Rovers and then picking up a back injury.

Norwich City
Maddison signed for Premier League club Norwich City on 1 February 2016 on a three-and-a-half-year contract for an undisclosed fee, but was immediately loaned back to Coventry City for the remainder of the 2015–16 season.

Maddison made his first team debut for Norwich in an EFL Cup tie against his former club Coventry on 23 August 2016. On 31 August 2016, Maddison was loaned to Scottish Premiership club Aberdeen for the first part of the 2016–17 season. He made his debut as a substitute against Inverness Caledonian Thistle, then started and scored in the next match in a 3–1 win against Dundee. He followed this with a last-minute winner against Rangers on 25 September.

After returning from his loan spell at Aberdeen, Maddison made his long-awaited league debut for Norwich on 17 April 2017, coming on as a substitute in the second half and scoring in a 3–1 win against Preston North End at Deepdale. Maddison signed a new four-year contract in June. With the arrival of new coach Daniel Farke, Maddison was given regular starts in the team during the 2017–18 season and was named Norwich City's Player of the Season at the end of the campaign, as well as receiving a nomination for the EFL Championship Young Player of the Season award.

Leicester City

Maddison signed for Premier League club Leicester City on 20 June 2018, on a five-year contract for an undisclosed fee thought to be around £20 million. He scored his first goal in the Premier League on 18 August in a 2–0 win against Wolverhampton Wanderers. He later followed up his impressive start for the club with back-to-back Premier League goals, from set-pieces, against AFC Bournemouth and Huddersfield Town, respectively. On 29 July 2020, he agreed a new four-year contract with Leicester.

On 27 September 2020, Maddison scored a curler outside the box in a 5–2 win against Manchester City in the league which was later voted as Premier League Goal of the Month.

On 11 April 2021, Maddison was one of three players dropped from Leicester's squad for the game against West Ham United after breaching COVID-19 protocols.

International career
Maddison was included in an England under-21 squad in March 2016, but was unable to play due to injury. He received his first call-up to the England under-21 team in November 2017, and made his debut against Ukraine in a 2019 UEFA European Under-21 Championship qualifier. He received his first call-up to the senior team in October 2018 for the UEFA Nations League matches against Croatia and Spain.

On 27 May 2019, Maddison was included in England's 23-man squad for the 2019 UEFA European Under-21 Championship and scored his first goal for his country during a 3–3 draw with Croatia at the San Marino Stadium on 24 June.

Maddison withdrew from the senior squad in October 2019 due to illness. He was later seen visiting a casino, although his conduct was defended by club manager Brendan Rodgers. Maddison made his debut for England on 14 November when he came on for Alex Oxlade-Chamberlain in the 56th minute of a 7–0 win over Montenegro in UEFA Euro 2020 qualifying.

After a three-year absence, he was announced as part of the 26-man England squad for the 2022 FIFA World Cup. However, he did not make any appearance in the tournament.

Personal life
Maddison and his partner, Kennedy Alexa, have a son who was born in July 2021.

Career statistics

Club

International

Honours
Leicester City
FA Cup: 2020–21
FA Community Shield: 2021

Individual
EFL Young Player of the Month: January 2018
PFA Team of the Year: 2017–18 Championship
Norwich City Player of the Season: 2017–18
Leicester City Player of the Year: 2021–22
EFL Team of the Season: 2017–18
Premier League Goal of the Month: September 2020

References

External links

Profile at the Leicester City F.C. website
Profile at the Football Association website

1996 births
Living people
Footballers from Coventry
English footballers
Association football midfielders
Coventry City F.C. players
Norwich City F.C. players
Aberdeen F.C. players
Leicester City F.C. players
English Football League players
Scottish Professional Football League players
Premier League players
FA Cup Final players
England under-21 international footballers
England international footballers
2022 FIFA World Cup players
English people of Irish descent